The 2011 FIBA Asia Under-16 Championship was the qualifying tournament for FIBA Asia at the Under-17 World Championship 2012. The tournament was held in Nha Trang, Vietnam from October 18 to October 28. China defeated Korea in the championship to notch their second title, and both the finalists represented FIBA Asia in the 2012 FIBA Under-17 World Championship in Lithuania.

Qualification 
According to the FIBA Asia rules, each zone had two places, and the hosts (Vietnam) and holders (China) were automatically qualified. The other four places are allocated to the zones according to performance in the 2009 FIBA Asia Under-16 Championship.

* Bahrain replaced by Qatar.

** Only 4 teams registered from East Asia.

Draw
The draw was held on September 25, 2011, at the Media Conference Room at the Wuhan Sports Center.

* Iran did not participate in the tournament due to the Vietnamese decision for not granting visa to Iranian players. Vietnamese Basketball Federation offered apology to Iran over failure to send visa for Iranian junior team to join the competition.

Preliminary round

Group A

Group B

Group C

Group D

Second round
 The results and the points of the matches between the same teams that were already played during the preliminary round shall be taken into account for the second round.

Group E

Group F

Classification 13th–14th

Classification 9th–12th

Semifinals

11th place

9th place

Final round

Quarterfinals

Semifinals 5th–8th

Semifinals

7th place

5th place

3rd place

Final

Final standing

Awards

References

External links
 FIBA Asia official website

FIBA Asia Under-16 Championship
2011–12 in Asian basketball
International basketball competitions hosted by Vietnam
2011–12 in Vietnamese basketball